Mathieu Denis is a Canadian screenwriter and film director from Quebec. He is best known for his films Corbo, which was a Canadian Screen Award and Quebec Cinema Award nominee for Best Picture in 2016, and Those Who Make Revolution Halfway Only Dig Their Own Graves (Ceux qui font les révolutions à moitié n'ont fait que se creuser un tombeau), which won the award for Best Canadian Film at the 2016 Toronto International Film Festival.

Denis made several short films before his feature film debut, Laurentia (Laurentie), in 2011. The most noted of his short films was Code 13, which was named to TIFF's annual year-end Canada's Top Ten list in 2007.

Most but not all of his films have been made in collaboration with Simon Lavoie.

References

External links

21st-century Canadian screenwriters
21st-century Canadian male writers
Canadian screenwriters in French
French Quebecers
Living people
Film directors from Quebec
Year of birth missing (living people)
Writers from Quebec